was a Japanese politician, who served in the Ikeda, Satō, Tanaka and Fukuda cabinets, and was the first to be appointed to the post of Director of the National Land Agency. Within the Liberal Democratic Party (LDP), he held influence in the Satō and Tanaka factions, becoming known as the "king's counselor", or the one able to speak his mind with ease.

Early life
Nishimura was born on 28 August 1897, in Higashikunisaki District, Ōita. He graduated from Tohoku Imperial University in 1924.

Career
Nishimura's first venture into public office was via the Ministry of Railways, and in the immediate postwar period he was director of the Electric Bureau of the Railway Department of the Ministry of Transport. In 1949, Nishimura won election to the House of Representatives of Japan.

In 1962, Nishimura landed his first cabinet position in the cabinet of Hayato Ikeda, serving as Minister of Health. He then went on to serve under Eisaku Satō, as Construction Minister, on two separate occasions.

In the 1970s, while Nishimura continued to serve in various cabinet posts, including as the first Director of the National Land Agency under Kakuei Tanaka, he also began to solidify his rise in the LDP, firstly as leader of the Tanaka faction within the party and then becoming vice president of the party as a whole by the end of the decade.

Nishimura retired from politics in 1983. He died on 15 September 1987.

Honours
Grand Cordon of the Order of the Sacred Treasure (1968)
Grand Cordon of the Order of the Rising Sun (1973)

References

External links

Historic Japanese cabinets (in Japanese), kantei.go.jp; accessed 31 January 2018.
Historic LDP Presidents, Secretaries General, Chairs of General Affairs Committee and of Policy Research Committee (in Japanese), geocities.co.jp/WallStreet-Stock/7643/; accessed 31 January 2018

|-

|-

|-

|-

|-

|-

20th-century Japanese politicians
Members of the House of Representatives (Japan)
Ministers of Health and Welfare of Japan
Construction ministers of Japan
Ministers of former Japanese ministries
Liberal Democratic Party (Japan) politicians
Tohoku University alumni
Kagoshima University alumni
People from Ōita Prefecture
1897 births
1987 deaths